LACS may refer to:

 Lacunar Stroke Syndrome
 League Against Cruel Sports in the UK, campaigns against fox hunting etc.
 Lehman Alternative Community School, a combined middle and high school in Ithaca, New York
 Locatable Address Conversion System, a U.S. Postal Service update mechanism
 Luxembourg American Cultural Society, a Luxembourgish-American organization based in Belgium, Wisconsin

Lacs may refer to:
 Lacs Region, a region of Côte d'Ivoire
 Lacs District, a district of Côte d'Ivoire
 Lacs, Indre, a commune in France
 Lacs Prefecture, Togo
 The Lacs, an American country rap duo

See also
 LAC (disambiguation)
 Lac (disambiguation)
 Lakh, a unit in the Indian numbering system
 Laks (disambiguation)
 Lax (disambiguation)